Bharat Shah (born 5 August 1944) is an indian businessman and diamond merchant, Hindi film financier and distributor, under his banner VIP Films. He has produced several Bollywood films, such as Dil Se.. (1998) starring Shah Rukh Khan and Manisha Koirala, Devdas (2002) starring Khan, Madhuri Dixit and Aishwarya Rai, and Rascals (2011) starring Sanjay Dutt, Ajay Devgn and Kangana Ranaut.

Filmography 
 Films

Legal affairs 
In 2001, Shah was arrested following an investigation into whether a film he financed, Chori Chori Chupke Chupke, was funded by the Indian mafia. This arrest led to a conviction in 2003 for not disclosing fellow producer, Nazim Rizwi's links to the Indian mafia. Rizwi and his assistant, Abdul Rahim Allahbaksh Khan, were also convicted of forging links with the Indian mafia to extort film personalities. Shah was sentenced to one year in jail but as he had already spent fourteen months in jail as part of his trial, he was freed. Rizwi and Khan each were sentenced to six years' rigorous imprisonment and a fine of  15 lakhs.

References

External links 
 
 More Movie Database

 Living people
 Hindi film producers
 Diamond dealers
 Indian film distributors
 Diamond industry in India
1944 births
 Place of birth missing (living people)
 Producers who won the Best Popular Film Providing Wholesome Entertainment National Film Award